Edgar Y. Choueiri (born 1961 in Lebanon) is a Lebanese American plasma physicist and previously President of the Lebanese Academy of Sciences. He is best known for clarifying the role of plasma instabilities in spacecraft electric thrusters (see plasma propulsion), for conceiving and developing new spacecraft propulsion concepts and, more recently, for his work on 3D audio.

Career 
Choueiri is Professor of applied physics and aerospace engineering at Princeton University. At Princeton, he also serves as Director of the Electric Propulsion and Plasma Dynamics Laboratory, Director of Princeton's Engineering Physics Program, and the Principal Investigator of Princeton University's 3D Audio and Applied Acoustics Lab (3D3A). He is Fellow of the American Institute of Aeronautics and Astronautics (AIAA) and previously President of the Electric Rocket Propulsion Society.

In 2004, Choueiri was knighted (Medal of the Order of the Cedars, Rank of Knight) for his work in astronautics by the President of the Republic of Lebanon.

References

External links
 Online bio at Princeton University
 Online bio at ASL
 Homepage of Princeton University's Electric Propulsion and Plasma Dynamics Laboratory
 Homepage of Princeton University's 3D Audio and Applied Acoustics (3D3A) Laboratory
 Edgar Y. Choueiri (26 January 2009). "The Efficient Future of Deep-Space Travel—Electric Rockets". Scientific American
 Choueiri, Edgar Y. (2009). New dawn of electric rocket

21st-century American physicists
American people of Lebanese descent
Lebanese academics
Princeton University faculty
1961 births
Living people
Knights of the National Order of the Cedar
Lebanese physicists
American plasma physicists